The Russian School of Mathematics (RSM) is an after-school program that provides mathematics education to children attending K–12 public and private schools. The school provides children with the opportunity to advance in mathematics beyond the traditional school curriculum. The founder of RSM is Inessa Rifkin and the co-founder is Irene Khavinson.

The focus of RSM is primary school mathematics. The high school level classes offer preparation for standardized tests such as the SAT, SAT II, and AP exams. Each class usually involves intensive reinforcement of topics using many examples and exercises. Accompanied by classwork, all students are given homework to reinforce what they have learned.

History 
According to the official website, Inessa Rifkin (born in Minsk, Belarus) and Irina Khavinson (born in Chernigov, Ukraine) left the USSR in search of a better life for their children. Together, they created a math education program based on quality and depth. According to the website, they "Sparked a Movement."  In 1997, the first class was held at Ms. Rifkin's kitchen table, also said to be in her living room, outside of Boston, Massachusetts. In October 1999, their first dedicated school building was established in a Boston-area suburb. They currently have approximately 40,000 students.

Locations
The after-school mathematics program was originally established in Boston, inside Inessa Rifkin's living room. Since then, the school has expanded to include more than 50 schools in the US and Canada, as well as online programs. RSM also runs an overnight camp in Sunapee, New Hampshire.

Controversy
On March 20, 2022 the cofounder Inessa Rifkin posted in the private RSM Summer Camp Facebook page  stating: 
Ukraine had a choice of surrender peacefully with min human casualties and min property loss to Putin. President Zelensky made a choice to fight back. He is risking not only his own life but by now thousands of civilians already lost their lives, among them a lot of children. On top of it almost 3,000,000 people become refugees. Theoretically one could argue that President Zelensky also, not only Putin, is responsible for human suffering. Was he right? Did he have a right to decide for other people’s children?

Rifkin has since elaborated on the statement on her facebook page, saying that this question was intentionally written in a provocative way not to express a view point, but to spark debate within the camp, and is similar to other questions about provocative topics such as Israel and the Holocaust asked in the past.

References

External links

"A Russian solution to U.S. problem" (Boston Globe article)

Private schools in Massachusetts
Schools in Middlesex County, Massachusetts
Russian-American culture in Massachusetts
Educational institutions established in 1997
1997 establishments in Massachusetts